Shelfanger Meadows is a  biological Site of Special Scientific Interest north of Diss in Norfolk.

This site in the valley of a tributary of the River Waveney is described by Natural England  as "one of the most important areas of unimproved grassland in Norfolk". It has been traditionally managed by a hay cut followed by grazing for hundreds of years, and as a result its flora is rich, including uncommon species. There are also areas where springs make the grassland marshy.

The site is private land with no public access.

References

Sites of Special Scientific Interest in Norfolk